Thomas Powell (1779–1863) was a Welsh entrepreneur who between 1829 and his death in 1863 became one of the most successful mine owners in Wales. By 1862 he owned 16 mines which in aggregate exported over 700,000 tons of coal, making him one of the largest coal exporters in the world.

See also
 Powell Duffryn

References

Welsh businesspeople
1779 births
1863 deaths